Sylvain Couturier (born April 23, 1968) is a Canadian former professional ice hockey left wing who played 33 games in the National Hockey League (NHL) for the Los Angeles Kings between 1988 and 1991. The rest of his career, which lasted from 1988 to 2001, was mainly spent in the minor leagues. Couturier was the general manager of the Acadie-Bathurst Titan of the Quebec Major Junior Hockey League from 2002 to 2022. He is the father of NHL player Sean Couturier.

Couturier was born in Greenfield Park, Quebec.

Career statistics

Regular season and playoffs

References

External links
 

1968 births
Living people
Acadie–Bathurst Titan coaches
Adirondack Red Wings players
Berlin Capitals players
Canadian expatriate ice hockey players in Germany
Canadian ice hockey coaches
Canadian ice hockey left wingers
Fort Wayne Komets players
Ice hockey people from Quebec
Laval Titan players
Los Angeles Kings draft picks
Los Angeles Kings players
Milwaukee Admirals (IHL) players
New Haven Nighthawks players
Sportspeople from Longueuil
Phoenix Roadrunners (IHL) players
Revier Löwen players
Verdun Dragons players